The Flower Baronetcy, of Lobb in the County of Oxford and of Woodford in the County of Essex, was a title in the Baronetage of the United Kingdom. It was created on 1 December 1809 for Charles Flower, Lord Mayor of London from 1808 to 1809. The title became extinct on the death of the second Baronet in 1850.

Flower baronets, of Lobb and Woodford (1809)
Sir Charles Flower, 1st Baronet (1763–1834)
Sir James Flower, 2nd Baronet (1794–1850)

References

Extinct baronetcies in the Baronetage of the United Kingdom